Königsbrück is a railway station in the town of Königsbrück, Saxony, Germany. The station lies on the Dresden-Klotzsche–Königsbrück railway and the train services are operated by DB Regio Südost. The line continuing to Bernsdorf closed on 5 November 2000. Königsbrück was also served by Königsbrück Ost railway station, which was on the closed line to Bernsdorf.

Train services
The station is served by the following services:

regional service RB 33 Dresden − Königsbrück

References

External links
 
Städtebahn Sachsen website

Railway stations in Saxony
railway station